"Touch" is a song recorded by American singer Pia Mia. It was released as the second single from her upcoming debut studio album on 30 October 2015 by Interscope Records. It was written by Pia Mia, co-written and produced by Stargate. The song has peaked to number 47 on both the Australian Singles Chart and the UK Singles Chart.

Music video
A music video to accompany the release of "Touch" was first released onto YouTube on 5 November 2015 at a total length of three minutes and thirty-seven seconds. O'Shea Jackson Jr. makes a cameo appearance as Pia's love interest.

Track listing

Chart performance

Weekly charts

Certifications

Release history

References

2015 singles
2015 songs
Pia Mia songs
Songs written by Justin Tranter
Songs written by Julia Michaels
Songs written by Tor Erik Hermansen
Songs written by Mikkel Storleer Eriksen
Song recordings produced by BloodPop
Song recordings produced by Stargate (record producers)
Interscope Records singles
Songs written by BloodPop